The Australia–Asia Power Link (AAPowerLink) is a proposed electricity infrastructure project that is planned to include the world's largest solar plant, the world's largest battery, and the world's longest submarine power cable. A solar farm in Northern Territory, Australia, will produce up to 20 gigawatts of electricity, most of which will be exported to Singapore, and at a later point Indonesia, by a  3 GW HVDC transmission line. A 36-42 GWh battery is planned to store energy to levelize energy availability as sunlight varies throughout the day.

AAPowerLink is being developed by the Singaporean firm Sun Cable, backed by Andrew Forrest and Mike Cannon-Brookes. It was projected to begin construction in mid-2023, with operation starting in early 2026 and completion by late 2027. The project would add AU$8 billion to the economy of the Northern Territory, then exporting AU$2 billion of electricity every year.

The project collapsed in January 2023, after Sun Cable was placed into voluntary administration following a disagreement between Forrest and Cannon-Brookes about the need to put more funding into the venture, though the project may continue under new ownership.

Design 
The solar plant would be in the Northern Territory near Elliott and Tennant Creek in the Barkly Region, using photovoltaic modules designed by Australian company 5B and prefabricated at a proposed factory in Darwin. The solar panels will cover  (12 km x 10 km) in an area with some of the best solar resources in the world. An  overhead power line will transmit 6.4 GW to Darwin, where it will transfer to a  2.2 GW undersea power line to Singapore. This undersea cable will be the longest undersea cable in the world, exceeding the existing longest undersea power cable by a factor of around five.

Batteries at the solar array in Darwin and Singapore will provide load-balancing for continuous daily dispatch.

Singapore produced 95% of its electricity in 2015 from natural gas, but seeks to reduce its greenhouse gas emissions. The AAPowerLink could provide about 20% of Singapore's electricity, with no carbon dioxide generation, reducing Singapore's emissions by 6 million tonnes per year.

In September 2021, it was announced that there would be further expansions to the proposed size of the project, from 10 GW to 20 GW capacity, and from 20 GWh to 36-42 GWh of battery storage, with a new estimated construction cost of $30 billion dollars. Forecasts suggest up to $A2 billion in exports, 1500 jobs in construction, 350 operational jobs, and 12,000 indirect jobs will be created across Australia, Singapore and Indonesia.

Development 
The project was initially called the Australia–Singapore Power Link, as the power line will initially connect those two countries.  It was later renamed to Australia-ASEAN, and again to Australia-Asia, as it may also bring electricity to Indonesia.

Sun Cable intends to secure all financing by late 2023, beginning construction the following year. It is expected to cost AU$30 billion (US$22.6 billion). Initial investments came from billionaires Mike Cannon-Brookes and Andrew Forrest.

In July 2019, the project received major project status from the Northern Territory government, ensuring local support in development and construction. The Australian government awarded the same status in July 2020, expediting construction by facilitating coordination and permitting. Singapore has not yet permitted the project, but benefits for it include long-term electricity price stability, the potential to become a hub for trading renewable electricity in the Southeast Asian power grid, and meeting its agreements to cut emissions under the Paris Agreement.

Undersea surveying of the Australian section of the (AAPL) cable route was completed in 2020 by Guardian Geomatics.

A project development agreement was signed between Northern Territory and Sun Cable in January 2021, providing for commercial partnership.

An Integrated Project Delivery Team (IPDT) composed of multi-disciplinary international partners was announced in October 2021, including Bechtel (Project Delivery), Hatch Ltd (HVDC Tramission), Marsh (Risk Management), PwC Australia (Project Advisory) and SMEC (Solar Generation System).

Construction was projected to require 1,000 jobs, and operation will have 300 jobs in the Northern Territory.

Australia is the world's largest exporter of coal. The AAPowerLink, along with the proposed wind and solar Asian Renewable Energy Hub in the Pilbara, would make it a "green energy exporting superpower."

In March 2022, it was announced that Sun Cable raised A$210m (€139m) Series B capital to fund the continued development of the project. The round was led by Grok Ventures and Squadron Energy.

At the time, it was expected to deliver first supply of electricity to Darwin in 2026, Singapore in 2027 with full capacity by end of 2028.

Administration of Sun Cable
In January 2023, Sun Cable went into voluntary administration. The Financial Times reported that the administration was caused after lead investors Forrest and Cannon-Brooks "clashed... over the terms of a new funding round", itself necessitated "since the project started missing milestones".

See also
List of HVDC projects
List of planned renewable energy projects
Solar power in Australia
Electricity sector in Singapore

References

Further reading

External links
Australia-Asia Power Link

Electric power transmission systems in Australia
HVDC transmission lines
Proposed electric power transmission systems
Proposed solar power stations in Australia
Electric power infrastructure in the Northern Territory
Proposed electric power infrastructure in Australia
Electric power infrastructure in Singapore
Proposed infrastructure
Companies based in the Northern Territory
Barkly Region
Proposed buildings and structures in Australia